The 1911 Carlisle Indians football team represented the Carlisle Indian Industrial School as an independent during the 1911 college football season. Led by tenth-year head coach Pop Warner, the Indians compiled a record of 11–1 and outscored opponents 298 to 49. The season included one of the greatest upsets in college football history. Against Harvard, Jim Thorpe scored all of the Indians' points in a shocking upset over the period powerhouse, 18–15. The only loss for Carlisle came at the hands of Syracuse the following week, 12–11. Walter Camp selected Thorpe first-team All-American. One source claims Thorpe was "recognized as the greatest player of the year and a man whose kicking is likely to revolutionize the game." College Football Hall of Fame members on the team include Thorpe, Gus Welch, and  William "Lone Star" Dietz.

Schedule

Players

Line

Backfield

See also
 1911 College Football All-America Team

References

Carlisle
Carlisle Indians football seasons
Carlisle Indians football